Wilbur Clyde Schwandt (June 28, 1904 in Manitowoc, Wisconsin – July 23, 1998 in Miami, Florida) was an American musician best known for his song "Dream a Little Dream of Me" with Fabian Andre. He frequently used the stage name Don Swan and released many Latin jazz albums in the 1950s and 1960s.

Career
Born in Manitowoc, Wisconsin, on June 28, 1904, he studied composition at the University of Chicago and became an arranger for various big bands, including comedian Bob Hope's touring show. In 1940, he became an arranger for Xavier Cugat's orchestra, a position he would hold for the next 20 years. He was an arranger and composer for Latin lounge musicians such as Skinnay Ennis and Freddy Martin as well as Latin dance musicians such as Perez Prado and Desi Arnaz.

In the late 1950s Schwandt was signed to Liberty Records as a recording artist and recorded five Latin lounge LPs, beginning with Mucho Cha Cha Cha. Subsequent LPs like All This and Cha Cha Too, Hot Cha Cha, and two volumes of Latino! featured an all-star ensemble of west coast musicians. The success of his albums allowed Swan to form a touring group with whom he played extensively in New York City and Las Vegas.

Schwandt retired from music in the mid-60s and eventually moved to Miami, Florida, where he died July 23, 1998, at the age of 94.

References

External links
 Discography at Discogs
 

1904 births
1998 deaths
Songwriters from Wisconsin
People from Manitowoc, Wisconsin
Latin jazz bandleaders
American bandleaders
20th-century American composers